Pratt & Whitney Measurement Systems is an American multinational corporation that specializes in producing  high-precision measuring instruments and systems.

History

The Pratt & Whitney Company was founded in 1860 by Francis A. Pratt and Amos Whitney, with headquarters in Hartford, Connecticut. The company manufactured machine tools, tools for the makers of sewing machines, and gun-making machinery for use by the Union Army during the American Civil War.

In 1925, Frederick Rentschler approached Pratt & Whitney for funding and a location to build his new aircraft engine.  Pratt & Whitney loaned him $250,000, the use of the Pratt & Whitney name, and space in their building. This was the beginning of the Pratt & Whitney Aircraft Company, which evolved into today's widely known aircraft engine manufacturer.

In 1929, Rentschler ended his association with Pratt & Whitney Machine Tool and formed United Aircraft and Transport Corporation, the predecessor to United Technologies Corporation. His agreement allowed him to carry the name with him to his new corporation.

For many years, the company maintained a plant on New Park Avenue near the Hartford/West Hartford border, where they manufactured machine tools such as their jig-bore machines and other numerically controlled machines. They also manufactured engine lathes, milling machines and twist drills. The company is currently located in Bloomfield, Connecticut.

Main product lines include universal comparators, bench micrometers, and inspection gaging systems. These instruments primarily use laser interferometers, encoders and LVDTs, and are primarily used in quality departments, calibration laboratories, and in manufacturing environments.

References

Further reading
 
 
 
  Chapter XIV, pp 173-185.

External links
 Pratt & Whitney Measurement Systems website

Bloomfield, Connecticut
Companies based in Hartford County, Connecticut
Instrument-making corporations
Metrology
Machine tool builders
Manufacturing companies based in Connecticut